Otisville may refer to the following American locations:

 Grand Rivers, Kentucky, previously known as Otisville
 Otisville, Michigan
 Otisville, New York